Lieutenant Malcolm Graham Stewart Burger was a World War I flying ace credited with five victories. He became an acting Captain in November 1918, and remained in the Royal Air Force after war's end.

Honors and awards
 Distinguished Flying Cross (DFC)
 Lieut. (A./Capt.) Malcolm Graham Stewart Burger. (FRANCE)
 "During the last battles this officer displayed marked gallantry and devotion to duty on low-flying bombing patrols, inflicting heavy casualties on numerous occasions. He has destroyed three enemy machines, and forced another to land." Supplement to the London Gazette, 8 February 1919 (31170/2036)

Sources of information

References
 Above the Trenches Supplement: A Complete Record of the Fighter Aces and Units of the British Empire Air Forces. Christopher F. Shores, Norman L. R. Franks, Russell Guest. Grub Street, 1996. , 

Royal Air Force personnel of World War I
1894 births
People from Graaff-Reinet
Recipients of the Distinguished Flying Cross (United Kingdom)
South African World War I flying aces
Year of death missing